--, a string of two hyphen-minus characters or - -, may approximate or refer to:

 En dash (–)
 Em dash (—), as a typewriter approximation
 Sig dashes (--), the email and Usenet signature delimiter
 For Unix commands,  used as a prefix for command options. By itself, it typically means the end of command options.
 Decrement operator in some programming languages
 Inline comments,  commonly used in programming languages
 Emoticon, a pictorial representation of a facial expression in characters

See also
 Double hyphen (one above the other)
 - (disambiguation)
 HTML comment tag, <!-- ... -->
 Horizontal rule, which is represented by "----" in MediaWiki markup
 ASCII art
 // (disambiguation)
 *** (disambiguation)
 ?? (disambiguation)